The majority of Ecuador's population is descended from a mixture of both European and Amerindian ancestry. The other 10% of Ecuador's population originate east of the Atlantic Ocean, predominantly from Spain, Italy, Lebanon, France and Germany. Around the Esmeraldas and Chota regions, the African influence would be strong among the small population of Afro-Ecuadorians that account for no more than 10%. Close to 80% of Ecuadorians are Roman Catholic, although the indigenous population blend Christian beliefs with ancient indigenous customs. Ethnic makeup of Ecuador: mestizo (mixed Amerindian and white) 70%, Amerindian 7%, Spanish and others 12%, black 11%.Ecuador can be split up into four parts, geographically; the Costa (coast), the Sierra (highlands), and El Oriente (the east; which includes the Amazonic region). The Galápagos Islands, or Archipiélago" de Colón, also belong to Ecuador.

There is tension and dislike between the residents of Quito and Guayaquil. Additionally, there is centralism in these two cities, so people from other provinces also tend to dislike its residents. Furthermore, due to the at times extreme cultural difference, between the Coast and the Sierra, there is a general dislike between those two regions that traces back to prehispanic times.Religions of Ecuador: Roman Catholic 95%, other 5%.

History

Ecuador was inhabited with numerous civilizations which constructed the ethnic cultural background of Ecuador years before the Inca Empire. Many civilizations rose throughout Ecuador, such as the Chorre and the Valdivia, the latter of which spans its existence before any civilization in the Americas. The most notable groups that existed in Ecuador before, and during the Inca conquest were the Quitus (near present-day Quito), the Cañari (in present-day Cuenca), and the Las Vegas Culture (near Guayaquil). Each civilization developed its own distinguished architecture, pottery, and religious beliefs, while others developed archaeologically disputed systems of writing (an achievement the Incas did not achieve). After years of fierce resistance, the Cañari succumbed to the Inca expansion, and were assimilated loosely under the Inca Empire. The Inca were an advanced society which originated in Peru, and established a great empire within one century. It dominated Peru and extended as far as Bolivia and central Chile, as well as Ecuador. To communicate with each other they developed stone-paved highways spanning thousands of miles used by messengers. These messengers passed each other records of the empire's status, which are sometimes thought to have been encoded in a system of knots called quipu.  Remarkably, the Cañari, Quitus, and Caras were able to hold back Tupac-Yupanqui for years, though they proved less successful against his son, Huayna Capac. After conquering Ecuador, Huayna Capac imposed upon the tribes the use of the Quechua (or Kichwa) language, lingua franca of the Inca and still widely spoken in Ecuador. The Cañaris were the strongest, and fiercest group in Ecuador to fall, and after their collapse and subsequent assimilation, the conquest of lands north became easier.

In celebration of his victory, Tupac Yupanqui ordered a great city to be built, Tomebamba, where is the present Cuenca, there he built a palace called Pumapungo over the ancient Cañari town. When he died in 1526, Huayna Capac divided the empire between his two sons, Atahualpa and Huáscar. Atahualpa ruled in the north from Quito, while Huáscar ruled in the south from Cuzco. Huáscar and Atuahualpa wanted all the empire, they could not share the territory, so an internal war took place. Francisco Pizarro landed in Ecuador in 1532, accompanied by 180 fully armed men, his mission was to find gold. Several years earlier, Pizarro had made a peaceful visit to the coast, where he heard rumors in Colombia of El Dorado of inland cities which had incredible amounts of gold. This time, he intended to conquer the Incas just as Hernando Cortez did in Mexico—and he couldn't have picked a better time. Atahualpa had only recently won the war against his brother Huáscar when Pizarro arrived. Pizarro ambushed the ruler, forced him to collect an enormous ransom, and then executed him. Spanish governors ruled Ecuador for nearly 300 years, first from the viceroyalty of Lima, then later from the viceroyalty of Gran Colombia. The Spanish introduced Roman Catholicism, colonial architecture, and today's national language. Independence was won in 1822, when the famed South American liberator Simón Bolívar joined Sucre and defeated a Spanish army at the Battle of Pichincha.

Regionalism
Each region is divided according to its own unique geography, creating a sense of individual regional pride. The most notable regional competition or confrontation is the one between Guayaquileños and Quiteños. This sense of regionalism has created many barriers between people. Due to regionalism, the economy has suffered severely, because people on either side will hesitate to do anything that might result in the expansion of the other's economy, even if it would mean slowing their own economy. During wartime, regionalism was considerably abated, but there are reports of individuals betraying their country, due to their desire to see the other region lose; for example, allegations that someone had given information to enemy troops during Tawantinzuma. Most of the regional fighting occurs among teenagers and college students.

Family
Ecuadorians place great importance on the family, both nuclear and extended. Unlike in much of the west, where the elderly are often placed in care facilities, elderly Ecuadorians will often live with one of their children. However, in recent years, the number of facilities to care for the elderly has grown significantly.

Godparents are also far more important in Ecuador than in other western countries, and they are expected to provide both financial and psychological support to their godchildren. Precisely for that reason, Ecuadorians with marital troubles will often ask their godparents for advice.

Families are formed in at least one of the following two ways: Civil Marriage (which is the legal form of formalizing a bond between a man and woman, which all married couples are required to undergo) and the Free Union (where a man and woman decide to form a family, without undergoing any official ceremony). The Ecuadorian Constitution accords the members of a Free Union family, the same rights and duties as any other legally constituted family.

There are many variations in family structure, as well as in the social and cultural structure in Ecuador, depending on the socioeconomic position in which people live. Generally, the upper classes adopt more white American or white European ways of life. This leads to great contrasts within the Ecuadorian people.

Marital roles

Women are generally responsible for the upbringing and care of children, and of husbands in Ecuador, and traditionally, men have taken a completely inactive role in this area. Recently has begun to change, due to the fact that more and more women are joining the workforce, which has resulted in men doing a little housework, and becoming slightly involved in the care of their children. This change has been greatly influenced by Eloy Alfaro's liberal revolution in 1906, in which Ecuadorian women were granted the right to work. Women's suffrage was granted in 1929.

Girls tend to be more protected by their parents than boys, due to traditional social structures. At age 15, girls often have traditional parties called fiesta de quince años. Quinceañera is the term used for the girl, not the party. The party involves festive food and dance. This coming of age or debutante party is a tradition found in most Latin American countries, comparable to the American tradition of sweet sixteen parties.

This special event also involves a doll being given away to show adulthood.

Television and cinema

The majority of the movies shown in movie theatres in Ecuador come from the United States. The movies are often in English, and have Spanish subtitles, but are sometimes translated for family movies.

The Ecuador Film Company was founded in Guayaquil in 1924. During the early 1920s to early 1930s, Ecuador enjoyed its Cinema Golden Age era. However, the production of motion pictures declined with the coming of sound.

Beyond the Gates of Splendor (2002), directed by Jim Hanon, is a documentary about five missionaries killed by the Huaorani Indians in the 1950s. He recycles the story in the 2006 Hollywood production End of the Spear. Most of this film was shot in Panama.

Entre Marx y una Mujer Desnuda (Between Marx and a Nude Woman, 1995), by Ecuadorian Camilo Luzuriaga, provides a window into the life of young Ecuadorian leftists living in a country, plagued by the remnants of feudal systems and coups d'état. It is based on a novel by Jorge Enrique Adoum.

Cuisine

An Ecuadorian's day, at least as far as his or her diet is concerned, is centered around lunch, rather than dinner as in Western cultures.

There is no one food that is especially Ecuadorian, as cuisine varies from region to region of the country. For example, costeños (people from the coast) prefer fish, beans, and plantains (unripened banana like fruits), while serranos from the mountainous regions prefer meat, rice, and white hominy mote.

Some general examples of Ecuadorian cuisine include patacones (unripe plantains fried in oil, mashed up, then refried), llapingachos (a pan seared potato ball), seco de chivo (a type of stew made from goat), and fanesca (a type of soup made from beans, lentils, and corn), traditionally served on Easter. More regionalized examples include ceviche from the coast, which is different from other ceviches, and is traditionally served unprepared, as well as almidon bread, plantains served with crushed peanuts or salprieta, and encebollado, the most popular dish on the coast, containing a marinade with large chunks of fish, onions, and various regional spices.

The term jerky in beef jerky originally comes from the word charqui in the ancient Inca language of Quechua.

Language

Most Ecuadorians speak Spanish, though many speak Amerindian languages such as Kichwa, the Ecuadorian dialect of Quechua. Other Amerindian languages spoken in Ecuador include Awapit (spoken by the Awá), A'ingae (spoken by the Cofan), Shuar Chicham (spoken by the Shuar), Achuar-Shiwiar (spoken by the Achuar and the Shiwiar), Cha'palaachi (spoken by the Chachi), Tsa'fiki (spoken by the Tsáchila), Paicoca (spoken by the Siona and Secoya),((chino)), and Wao Tededeo (spoken by the Waorani).

Though most features of Ecuadorian Spanish are those universal to the Spanish-speaking world, there are several idiosyncrasies.

Costeños tend to speak more quickly and louder than serranos'", with linguistical similarties to Canarian Spanish. A common term costeños call one another is mijo, a contraction of the phrase mi hijo ("my son"). Several such terms are derived in consequence of their rapid speech, and they also employ intricate linguistic humor and jokes that are difficult to translate or even understand in the other regions. Furthermore, each province has a different variety of accent, with different specific terms.

Serranos usually speak softly and with less speed. They are traditionally seen as more conservative, and use a number of Kichwa-derived terms in their everyday speech which is often puzzling to other regions. A widely known example is the word wawa which means "child" in Kichwa. Their speech is influenced by their Incan Amerindian roots, and can be seen as a variant of other Andean accents. However two main accents are noticed in the Andean region, the north and the austral accent. More variations of the austral accent are found in southern regions.

Whistling, yelling, or yawning to get someone's attention is considered rude, yet is practiced informally.

Art

Indigenous art of Tigua
The Kichwa people of Tigua, located in the central Sierra region, are world-renowned for their traditional paintings on sheepskin canvases. Historically, the Tigua people have been known for painting highly decorative masks and drums; painting on flat surfaces is somewhat of a modern occurrence. Today, Tigua paintings can be found for sale all over Ecuador, particularly in touristic areas.

Tigua artists are celebrated for their use of vibrant colors and simplistic themes. Most paintings depict scenes of pastoral life, religious ceremonies, and festivals. The volcano Cotopaxi is commonly depicted in the landscape of many paintings, as it holds particular cultural significance in the region.

Literature

San Juan de Ambato, a city in central Ecuador, is known as the "City of the three Juanes", with Juan Montalvo (a novelist and essayist), Juan León Mera (author of the words to Ecuador's national anthem, and "Salve, Oh Patria"), and Juan Benigno Vela (another novelist and essayist) all sharing it as a place of birth. Other important writers include Eugenio Espejo, from colonial Quito, whose works inspired the fight for freedom from Spain in Ecuador and touched a number of topics, novelist and poet Horacio Hidrovo Velásquez, from early century's Manabí, whose works have inspired films.

Music

The music of Ecuador has a long history. Pasillo is a genre of indigenous Latin music. In Ecuador it is the "national genre of music." Through the years, many cultures have brought their influences together to create new types of music. There are also different kinds of traditional music like albazo, pasacalle, fox incaico, tonada, diablada pillareña, capishca, Bomba (highly established in afro-Ecuadorian society in cities such as Esmeraldas), and so on.
Tecnocumbia and Rockola are clear examples of the influence of foreign culturese. One of the most traditional forms of dancing in Ecuador is Sanjuanito. It's originally from northern Ecuador (Otavalo-Imbabura). Sanjuanito is a danceable music used in the festivities of the mestizo and indigenous cultures. According to the Ecuadorian musicologist Segundo Luis Moreno, Sanjuanito was danced by indigenous people during San Juan Bautista's birthday. This important date was established by the Spaniards on June 24, coincidentally the same date when indigenous people celebrated their rituals of Inti Raymi.
The Panama hat is of Ecuadorian origin, and is known there as "Sombrero de paja toquilla", or a Jipijapa. It is made principally in Montecristi, in the province of Manabí and in the province of Azuay. Its manufacture (particularly that of the Montecristi superfino) is considered a great craft. In Cuenca an important Panama hat industry exists.

Sports

Football is the most popular sport in Ecuador. Some of the most noteworthy accomplishments of Ecuadorian football teams are those of Barcelona SC, having accumulated a total of 16 domestic titles, and of LDU Quito having both won the Copa Libertadores and placed second in the FIFA Club World Cup in 2008; all are feats that are currently unmatched by other teams in Ecuador.

Information on all other Ecuadorian sports related articles are below:
 Football in Ecuador
 Ecuador national football team
 Ecuador women's national football team
 Ecuador national under-20 football team
 Ecuador national baseball team
 Ecuadorian volleyball (Ecua-volley)

See also
 Latin American culture
 Hispanic culture
 Music of Ecuador
 Religion in Ecuador

References

External links
 Ecuador people and culture
 Hip ECUADOR
 Ecuador
 Archaeology of Ecuador
 Museum and Virtual Library (Museums of Central Bank of Ecuador) English